Punko (Пунько) is a Russian surname and may refer to:

Surname
Sergey Punko (born 1981), Belarus-born Russian swimmer
Anna Punko (born 1989), Russian handball player

Given name
Punko, stage name of David N. Donihue (born 1974), American writer, director and actor